Gustaf VI Adolfs Pokal is a trophy awarded annually by the Swedish Football Association to the football club that wins Svenska Cupen, Sweden's premier football cup. The trophy was first introduced in 1967 to celebrate the reintroduction of Svenska Cupen after a break since 1953. The trophy was awarded until 1983 when Svenska Cupen was rebranded as Skandiacupen. Two different trophies were used between 1984 and 2001, Skandiacupen and SvFFs Pokal. Gustaf VI Adolfs Pokal was reintroduced as the cup trophy in 2002 and has been awarded annually since then. The first club to lift the trophy was Malmö FF in 1967 and are the current holders having won the Svenska Cupen in 2022 over Hammarby the winners in 2021. IFK Göteborg is the clubs to lift the trophy the most times, having lifted it seven times.

The trophy
The trophy is made of silver and has a small football mounted on its top. The trophy is designed like a torso with a broad base and a broad top connected with a slightly more narrow body. The trophy was designed and created by jewelers Bo and Peter Fahlström. The trophy is named after Gustaf VI Adolf of Sweden, king of Sweden between 1950 and 1973.

Trophy winners

Trophy champions

References

Association football trophies and awards
European football trophies and awards